"I Don't Know" is a single from the Canadian band The Sheepdogs. It was featured as the third track on their third album, Learn & Burn.

Versions
Two recorded versions of the song exist. One is found on the album Learn & Burn, while the other is on the EP Five Easy Pieces. The differences between them are noticeable but not substantial; Canadian modern rock and active rock stations generally play the Five Easy Pieces version.

Awards and nominations
On April 1, "I Don't Know" won the Juno Award for Single of the Year. It beat out "Fragile Bird" by City and Colour, "Invincible" by Hedley, "When We Stand Together" by Nickelback and "Let's Go Higher" by Johnny Reid. Several media sources, including The Globe and Mail and The Winnipeg Free Press considered their win to be an upset.

Charts

References

2011 singles
2010 songs
Juno Award for Single of the Year singles
The Sheepdogs songs